C.M. Gardner State Park is a Massachusetts state park located in the town of Huntington along a section of the east branch of the Westfield River. The land for the park was donated to the state in 1959 in memory of Charles M. Gardner, a local farmer, writer, and National Grange leader. The park is managed by the Department of Conservation and Recreation.

Activities and amenities
The park offers walking trails, picnicking, restrooms, a boat launch for canoeing, and fishing on the Westfield River. Restricted hunting is also available.
Swimming has been prohibited since 2006 due to failure to meet water quality standards.

References

External links

C.M. Gardner State Park Department of Conservation and Recreation

State parks of Massachusetts
Parks in Hampshire County, Massachusetts
1959 establishments in Massachusetts
Protected areas established in 1959